Edosa fraudulens is a moth of the  family Tineidae. It is found in Australia.

Moths described in 1885
Perissomasticinae